The 1931 Southern League was the third season of speedway in the United Kingdom for Southern British teams, and its final season before amalgamation of the Southern and Northern Leagues. The Northern teams also had their third season known as the 1931 Speedway Northern League.

Summary
Both Birmingham teams based at Perry Barr and Hall Green had left as had Coventry who returned mid-season to replace Leicester who were liquidated in April. Harringay Canaries resigned in June to be replaced by Belle Vue who then rode both in the Northern and Southern Leagues. Nottingham closed in July but they were not replaced and their results stood. The league season was the longest in the short history of the competition as teams met each other four times instead of twice.

The Wembley Lions won their second consecutive title finishing three points clear of 1929 champions Stamford Bridge. The league suffered a fatality during the match between Belle Vue and Wembley at Hyde Road. James Allen (known as Indian Allen) was thrown from his bike and hit his head on a fence, trying to avoid a rider who had fallen in front of him. He died three days later in hospital on 12 September 1931.

Final table

 * Harringay scored 12 points from 14 matches, Belle Vue scored 16 from 24
 ** Leicester scored 1 point from 8 matches, Coventry scored 16 from 30

Top Five Riders

National Trophy
The 1931 National Trophy was the first edition of the Knockout Cup. It was contested between teams from the Southern and Northern Leagues.

First round

Second round

Quarterfinals

Semifinals

Final

First leg

Second leg

Wembley were declared National Trophy Champions, winning on aggregate 120-69.

See also
List of United Kingdom Speedway League Champions
Knockout Cup (speedway)

References

Speedway Southern League
1931 in British motorsport
1931 in speedway